Mowrok may refer to:
 Mowrok, Isfahan
 Mowrok, Yazd